Safayyeh Rural District is a rural district (dehestan) in the Central District of Najafabad County, Isfahan Province, Iran. At the 2006 census, its population was 921, in 268 families.  The rural district has 2 villages.

References 

Rural Districts of Isfahan Province
Najafabad County